The Battle of Ctesiphon was a battle fought between the Roman and Parthian empires. The Roman emperor Septimius Severus, faced by fierce resistance, succeeded in sacking the Parthian capital, and also deported some of its inhabitants.

References

Sources 
 
 

Ctesiphon 198
Ctesiphon
Ctesiphon
2nd century in Iran
198
190s in the Roman Empire
Sieges of Ctesiphon